Szombierki is a district of Bytom, Poland, located in the southern part of the city.

Szombierki Heat Power Station and Szombierki Coal Mine (KWK Szombierki), both recognized as important historical and industrial monuments, are located here.

In 2004 the winding tower "Krystyna" of the former coal mine KWK Szombierki and its surroundings was listed as a National Heritage Site. In 2009 the tower and the Power Station were voted as two of the "Seven Architectural Wonders of the Silesian Voivodeship." In 2013 the Power Station was also recognized as a national heritage site.

The village of Szombierki was first mentioned in documents in 1369. In 1768, the first coal mine was established in Szombierki. However, it was closed around 1820. During World War II, Nazi Germany held prisoners of war in the settlement. POWs worked as forced labourers in the local coal mine, which formed the E72 subcamp of the Stalag VIII-B/344 prisoner of war camp.

Szombierki is home to football club Szombierki Bytom, established in 1919, Polish champions from 1980.

The historic churches of Saint Margaret and of the Sacred Heart of Jesus are located in the district.

Etymology and other names

Etymology
The origin of the district's name is disputed, some suggest it derived from the name of Fridericus de Schonenburch, a knight who was a witness of the vassalage of Casimir II to the king of Bohemia, while others point towards "Schönberg" (Meaning Beautiful Mountain in German), a medieval settlement located in the approximate area of Szombierki.

Name of the district in various languages

Former names
Shortly after the Polish communist authorities took over Szombierki, its name was officially changed to "Chruszczów". The origin of the name is unknown and it was changed back in 1985.

Religion
At the turn of the 20th and 19th centuries Szombierki had a population of roughly 3,000 people and the village was subordinate to the  Holy Trinity church in Bytom. It was decided that a church was to be built in Szombierki and the construction began in 1902. It was designed by Wilhelm Wieczorek and funded by the Schaffgotsch. In 1904 the Church of the Most Sacred Heart of Jesus in Szombierki was completed and it was consecrated on the 20th of June, 1905.

List of churches in Szombierki

Notable people
 Johannes Schweter (born 1901), German NSDAP politician
 Carl-Heinz Stephan (1904-1989), German mining manager
 Wiktor Maks, Pole, President and co-founder of TS Poniatowski (now Szombierki Bytom)

Gallery

References

 
Neighbourhoods in Silesian Voivodeship
Bytom